Saroja Vaidyanathan (born 19 September 1937) is a choreographer, guru and a notable exponent of Bharatanatyam. She was conferred the Padma Shri in 2002 and the Padma Bhushan in 2013 by the Government of India.

Early life and education 
Saroja was born in Bellary, Karnataka in 1937. She received her initial training in Bharatanatyam at the Saraswati Gana Nilayam in Chennai and later studied under guru Kattumannar Muthukumaran Pillai of Thanjavur. She has also studied Carnatic music under Professor P. Sambamoorthy at Madras University and has a D.Litt in dance from the Indira Kala Sangeet Vishwavidyalaya, Khairagarh.

Bharatanatyam career 
Saroja gave up dancing after her marriage following conservative and adverse reactions to her performing in public venues and took instead to teaching children dance at home. Following her husband's transfer to Delhi in 1972, she established the Ganesa Natyalaya there in 1974. She was monetarily supported by well wishers and sponsors and the building for the Natyalaya came up at the Qutub Institutional Area in 1988. Besides the dance itself, students at the Ganesh Natyalaya are also taught Tamil, Hindi and Carnatic vocal music to give them a holistic understanding of Bharatanatyam.

Saroja is a prolific choreographer and has to her credit ten full length ballets and nearly two thousand individual Bharatanatyam items. She undertook a cultural tour of South East Asia in 2002, accompanying Prime Minister Atal Bihari Vajpayee's visit to the ASEAN Summit in 2002. She has also published her renditions of Subramania Bharati's songs and poems and some of his works have also been set to dance by her.

Books 
Saroja Vidyanathan has written a number of books on Bharatanatyam and Carnatic music including The Classical Dances of India, Bharatanatyam – An In-Depth Study, Carnataka Sangeetham, and The Science of Bharatanatyam.

Family 
Saroja's (née Dharmarajan) parents were both authors and her mother Kanakam Dharmarajan was a writer of detective fiction in Tamil. Saroja is married to Vaidyanathan an IAS officer of the Bihar cadre. The couple have a son, Kamesh and their daughter in law Rama Vaidyanathan is a well known Bharatanatyam artiste of international fame. Saroja's grand-daughter, Dakshina Vaidyanathan Baghel is also a sought-after Indian classical dancer.

Awards and honours 

Saroja was conferred the Padma Shri in 2002 and the Padma Bhushan in 2013 by the Government of India. She is also the recipient of the Sahitya Kala Parishad Samman of the Government of Delhi, the Kalaimamani title bestowed by the Tamil Nadu Eyal Isai Nataka Manram and the Sangeet Natak Akademi Award. She was conferred the title of 'Bharata Kalai Sudar' in 2006.

References 

Bharatanatyam exponents
Recipients of the Padma Shri in arts
Recipients of the Sangeet Natak Akademi Award
Performers of Indian classical dance
Indian classical choreographers
Recipients of the Padma Bhushan in arts
1937 births
Living people
Dancers from Andhra Pradesh
Indian female classical dancers
Indian women choreographers
Indian choreographers
People from Bellary
20th-century Indian dancers
Women artists from Karnataka
Teachers of Indian classical dance
Women educators from Karnataka
Indian dance teachers
20th-century Indian educators
20th-century Indian women artists
Educators from Karnataka
20th-century women educators
Recipients of the Sangeet Natak Akademi Fellowship